Sharp Street Memorial United Methodist Church and Community House is a historic United Methodist church located at Baltimore, Maryland, United States. It is an 1898 Gothic Revival stone structure of massive proportions.  It features sharply pitched gables, a square parapeted 85-foot-high bell tower, lancet windows, and Gothic influenced interior decorative detailing. The Community House is a Georgian Revival influenced brick structure, four stories high and built in 1921.  The congregation was organized in 1787 and was highly influential in the antebellum freedom movement, the establishment of the first black school in Baltimore after the abolition of slavery, and the movement to foster the institution of the African American Methodist church.  It is known as the "Mother Church" of Black Methodism in Maryland. The National Association for the Advancement of Colored People, during their formative years, held their meetings at this historic church.

Sharp Street Memorial United Methodist Church and Community House was listed on the National Register of Historic Places in 1982.

See also
 African Academy and Sharp Street Methodist Church (1797–1898)

References

External links

, including undated photo, at Maryland Historical Trust
Sharp Street Memorial United Methodist Church website

Churches in Baltimore
United Methodist churches in Maryland
Properties of religious function on the National Register of Historic Places in Baltimore
African-American history in Baltimore
Gothic Revival church buildings in Maryland
Churches completed in 1898
19th-century Methodist church buildings in the United States
1898 establishments in Maryland
Churches on the National Register of Historic Places in Maryland